Onykia robsoni, the rugose hooked squid, is a species of squid in the family Onychoteuthidae. It occurs in the Antarctic Ocean, at an estimated depth of 250–550 meters. The mantle of this species grows to a length of 75 cm. The species has been suggested as a junior synonym of Onykia carriboea, the tropical clubhook squid, due to similarities between the species.

References
"Moroteuthis robsoni, Rugose Hooked Squid", SeaLifeBase. http://www.sealifebase.org/summary/SpeciesSummary.php?id=57601&lang=English, October 29, 2008.

References

External links
 Tree of Life web project: Onykia robsoni

Squid
Molluscs described in 1962